John Andersson, better known as Zoo Brazil, is a Swedish multiplatinum Grammy-nominated record producer, songwriter and DJ residing in Stockholm, Sweden.

Musical career

Zoo Brazil first started DJing in 1989. His father was a musician who influenced him. In 2007 he received a Grammy nomination for his work on Kylie Minogue's album X.

As a DJ he has performed all over the world at clubs including Ministry of Sound, Space and Pacha, and has played underground clubs and festivals all over the world from Australia, Europe, North and South America including Creamfields .

Andersson has written music for various Hollywood movies, TV shows such as Nip/Tuck and channels such as BBC, Discovery, MTV, HBO, Channel 4 and more. In 2012 he composed music for the para olympics opening ceremony in London and music for the Dermablend "Go Beyond The Cover"video which has reached over 30 million views on YouTube and was awarded with the 2 silver lions at the Cannes festival.

Beginning of 2015 he released his third Djmix cd called "Songs for Clubs vol.3", remixed Giorgio Moroder & Kylie Minogue's "Right Here, Right Now" that went number 1 on Billboard Dance Chart, and released "Save Us" with Per QX on Steve Angello's Size Records.

Discography

Albums

Compilations

Singles

Extended Play

Remixes

References

Swedish record producers
Year of birth missing (living people)
Living people